Nangan may refer to:

Nangan, Lienchiang (Matsu Island), one of the Matsu Islands and the chief township of Lienchiang County, Republic of China (Taiwan)
Nangan, Luoshan County (楠杆镇), town in Luoshan County, Henan, People's Republic of China